Yones Felfel (born 24 November 1995) is a Danish footballer, playing as forward.

Club career

F.C. Copenhagen

Felfel was a part of F.C. Copenhagen's 2013–14 UEFA Youth League campaign, where he went to score against Juventus away and Real Madrid at home.

In the winter break of the 2013-14 season, Felfel was promoted to the first team. He gained his first Superliga match on 14 March 2014, when he replaced Thomas Kristensen in an away game against SønderjyskE.

Felfel scored his first goal for FCK, in the Danish Cup, on 4 December 2014 against Greve Fodbold.

FC Vestsjælland
On 11 August 2015, Felfel signed a 2-year contract with FC Vestsjælland.

Return to HIK
In January 2019, Felfel returned to his former youth club Hellerup IK playing in the Danish 2nd Division. He left the club at the end of 2021.

Honours

Club
Copenhagen
 Danish Superliga: 2015–16
 Danish Cup: 2014–15

FC Vaduz
Liechtenstein Football Cup: 2016-17

References

External links 
  National team profile
  elitefootball profile

1995 births
Living people
Danish men's footballers
Danish expatriate men's footballers
Danish Superliga players
Danish 2nd Division players
Swiss Super League players
F.C. Copenhagen players
FC Vestsjælland players
FC Vaduz players
Danish people of Egyptian descent
Expatriate footballers in Liechtenstein
Denmark youth international footballers
Association football forwards
Danish expatriate sportspeople in Liechtenstein